Our Brand Is Crisis is a 2005 American documentary film by Rachel Boynton on American political campaign marketing tactics by Greenberg Carville Shrum (GCS) in the 2002 Bolivian presidential election. The election saw Gonzalo Sánchez de Lozada elected President of Bolivia, ahead of Evo Morales.

The film is distributed by Koch-Lorber Films.

"This film is a cautionary tale which comes at a very timely moment," said Koch-Lorber Films president Richard Lorber in a statement to indieWIRE. "The parallels to the current U.S. administration's approach to selling the war in Iraq are staggering."

Cast
 Mauricio Balcazar (Goni's Press Advisor)
 James Carville (GCS Strategist)
 Tad Devine (GCS Advertising Consultant)
 Mark Feierstein (GCS Pollster)
 Stan Greenberg (GCS Pollster)
 Carlos Mesa (VP Candidate)
 Evo Morales (Opposing Candidate)
 Jeremy Rosner (GCS Pollster)
 Gonzalo Sánchez de Lozada (aka "Goni"; Bolivia's Presidential Candidate)
 Robert Shrum
 Tal Silberstein (GCS Management Consultant)
 Manfred Reyes Villa (Opposing Candidate)
 Amy Webber (GCS Associate)

Awards
 The film won the Charles E. Guggenheim Emerging Artist Award at the 2005 Full Frame Documentary Film Festival;
 Boynton was nominated for the Truer Than Fiction Award at the Independent Spirit Awards;
 The film shared the International Documentary Association's top prize for Best Feature Documentary in 2005. 
 Official Selection at the 2005 South by Southwest Festival 
 Official Selection at the 2005 Edinburgh International Film Festival

Reception

The film has a 92% approval rating with a score of 7.29/10 on Rotten tomatoes.

Remake

Actor George Clooney produced a 2015 fictionalization of Our Brand Is Crisis, starring Sandra Bullock.

References

External links 
 
 
 
 
 
 Our Brand Is Crisis at SourceWatch

2005 films
Documentary films about elections
Films scored by Marcelo Zarvos
Films set in 2002
Films set in Bolivia
Works about Bolivia
Works about marketing